Japhet Kosgei (born 20 December 1968) is a retired long-distance runner from Kenya, who won several marathons during his career, including the 1999 edition of the Rotterdam Marathon and 2006 Belgrade Marathon. His personal best is 2:07:09. He won the Lisbon Half Marathon 1999.

Achievements

References

External links

 Profile

1968 births
Living people
Kenyan male long-distance runners
Kenyan male marathon runners